Catandica (before independence known as Vila Gouveia) is a town located in the province of Manica in Mozambique. It is the administrative center of Báruè District. As of 2008 it had a population of 29 052.

The town, near the border with Zimbabwe, takes its name from the son of a local chief who had served in the army.

References

Populated places in Manica Province